Katherine Villiers, Duchess of Buckingham, Marchioness of Antrim, 18th Baroness de Ros of Helmsley (née Lady Katherine Manners; died 1649) was an English aristocrat. The daughter and heir of Francis Manners, 6th Earl of Rutland, she was known as the richest woman in Britain outside of the royal family. She married first George Villiers, 1st Duke of Buckingham, the favourite, and possibly lover, of King James I of England; and secondly, she married the Irish peer Randal MacDonnell, 1st Marquess of Antrim.

Family
Lady Katherine Manners was the only daughter of Francis Manners, 6th Earl of Rutland, by his first wife, Frances Knyvet (d. before 26 November 1605), widow of Sir William Bevill of Killigarth or Kilkhampton, Cornwall, and third daughter and coheir of Sir Henry Knyvet of Charlton, Wiltshire, by Elizabeth Stumpe, the daughter of Sir James Stumpe of Bromham, Wiltshire.

In 1613 Katherine and several of her relatives fell ill at their home in Belvoir Castle, and her brother Henry died. In 1619 two former servants were convicted of having used witchcraft to attack the family.

Career

Katherine Manners was selected by the formidably ambitious Mary Villiers, Countess of Buckingham, to marry her son, George Villiers. However, Manners was a strict Roman Catholic, and the King refused to allow Villiers to marry her (almost the only occasion when he did not give the Villiers family whatever they asked for). In addition to this, the Earl of Rutland refused to accept the Countess of Buckingham's demands for his daughter's dowry. Manners converted to Protestantism, to satisfy the Villiers family, which almost caused her father to call off the marriage. Invited to visit the Countess of Buckingham, Katherine was forced to spend the night due to an attack of illness. Believing his daughter's honour to be compromised, the Earl of Rutland refused to receive her back, and demanded that George Villiers marry her immediately. At this Villiers refused to marry her, but did a few weeks later, on 16 May 1620.

The Duchess of Buckingham was one of the few women of rank of the time whose "gentleness and womanly tenderness, devotion and purity of life", were conspicuous in the midst of the "almost universal corruption and immorality of the Court". No scandal was ever breathed against her name, and the worst that was ever said of her was that by her influence she at one time nearly persuaded her husband to become a Roman Catholic, she herself having returned to her own faith soon after her marriage.

In London, she resided at York House. Her rooms included the Red and Green closets or cabinets, decorated with small old master paintings. These spaces probably resembled the surviving contemporary Green closet at Ham House. A surviving pair of chairs carved in an Italian style, and painted with Villiers and Manners heraldry, may have been used in a gallery.

She was the mother of Mary Villiers, Duchess of Richmond and of George Villiers, 2nd Duke of Buckingham (who inherited her title as 20th Baron de Ros). Katherine's first husband, Buckingham, was murdered in 1628 by John Felton. Upon the death of her father in 1632, without male heirs, she succeeded suo jure to the ancient barony of de Ros. In 1635 she married Randal McDonnell, Earl of Antrim, and went to live at Dunluce Castle, County Antrim, Ireland. Following the Catholic uprising in Ulster in 1641 the MacDonnell family moved south to Wexford, then Waterford, where Katherine died in 1649. She was buried outside the walls of Waterford and it is speculated that she may have been a victim of the plague. Her possessions passed to her son and a memorial was erected in Westminster Abbey.

Notes

References

 
 

Year of birth unknown
Date of death unknown
1649 deaths
19
Daughters of British earls
English duchesses by marriage
Antrim
Hereditary women peers
Katherine
Katherine Villiers, Duchess of Buckingham
Burials at Westminster Abbey
Wives of knights
Household of Henrietta Maria
Ladies of the Bedchamber